Tetraclita serrata, the grey volcano barnacle, is a species of symmetrical sessile barnacle in the family Tetraclitidae. It is found in Africa.

References

serrata
Crustaceans described in 1954